Guillermo Saavedra Tapia (5 November 1903 – 12 May 1957) was a Chilean football midfielder, who played for his native country in the 1930 FIFA World Cup. He was also part of Chile's team at the 1928 Summer Olympics.

Honours

Club
Colo-Colo
 Campeonato de Apertura: 1933

References

External links

 

1903 births
1957 deaths
Chilean footballers
Chile international footballers
Colo-Colo footballers
Chilean football managers
Colo-Colo managers
1930 FIFA World Cup players
Association football midfielders
Unión La Calera managers
Olympic footballers of Chile
Footballers at the 1928 Summer Olympics
People from Rancagua